Egomania (Love Songs) is the second album by Cobra Verde, released in 1997 through Scat Records.

Critical reception
The Chicago Tribune wrote: "Creating classic rock in the best sense of the term, this Ohio quartet meshes instrumental prowess, great songwriting, passion and a dark edge in ways that one rarely encounters today."

Track listing

Personnel 
Cobra Verde
Don Depew – bass guitar, guitar, vocals, engineering
Doug Gillard – guitar, bass guitar, keyboards, vocals
John Petkovic – vocals, guitar, keyboards
Dave Swanson – drums, guitar
Production and additional personnel
Nick Amster – mixing
Cobra Verde – production
Bruce Gigaz – mixing
Robert Pollard – vocals

References 

1997 albums
Cobra Verde (band) albums
Scat Records albums